The Los Angeles Sol was an American professional soccer club that was based in the Los Angeles suburb of Carson, California that participated in Women's Professional Soccer.

The team was co-owned and operated by Blue Star, LLC and AEG, a subsidiary of the Anschutz Entertainment Group. The Sol had played its home games at The Home Depot Center. It was announced on January 28, 2010 that the team would cease operations.

History
The formation of Women's Professional Soccer was announced on September 4, 2007, and it was also announced on that day that a franchise had been awarded to Los Angeles. The Los Angeles Sol was officially unveiled on October 26, 2008. USA Women's National Team midfielder Shannon Boxx was the first player in Sol history when she was allocated to the team on September 16, 2008.

2009 season
The team played its first game on March 29, 2009, against Washington Freedom resulting in a 2–0 victory. The first goal in club and league history was recorded in the sixth minute of the match, when defender Allison Falk out-jumped a crowd of Freedom defenders in the penalty area to head in a free kick from Japan nationall team star Aya Miyama.

The Sol won their next two games as well, totaling a +5 goal differential, setting them apart early as the best team in the league.  Though they did not win either of their next two games, they never dropped from first place in the table, and then went on an eleven-game unbeaten streak, with three draws and eight wins, at times having twice the number of points as the second-place team.  They then lost to the Saint Louis Athletica in their last home game of the season, which ended their streak and kept alive the hopes that some team other than the Sol could win the regular season title, but a 0–0 draw against FC Gold Pride (who was the worst team in the league) gave the Sol the regular season title with two games to spare.  The lost 1–3 to the Chicago Red Stars and won 2–1 against the Boston Breakers to end their regular season, the win giving the Sol the title of the first team to beat every other team in the league.  They finished the season with 41 pts. (a 12–3–5 record) and a +17 goal differential.

Being regular season champions, the Sol received a bye to the August 22nd championship match. They lost 0–1 to Sky Blue FC who made the playoffs when potential invitees Boston earned no points in their final regular season match against the Sol.

Sale and folding
In November, AEG gave their share of the Sol back to WPS.  WPS ran the Sol for the next three months, completing trades, changing coaches, and participating in the 2010 WPS Draft.  However, the potential ownership group that WPS had been working with to take on the Sol backed out "in the 11th hour" according to league commissioner Tonya Antonuci.  Following this failure to sell the team, the league announced its decision to disband the Sol on January 27, 2010, and organized a dispersal draft for the 19 players under contract to be held February 4.

Players

2009 Roster

Milestones

 First game: 2–0 vs. Washington Freedom, Home Depot Center; March 29, 2009
 Largest win: 4–0 vs. Chicago Red Stars, Home Depot Center; June 27, 2009
 Worst defeat: 1–3 vs. Chicago Red Stars, Toyota Park; August 2, 2009

See also

 Women's Professional Soccer
 National Women's Soccer League
 Los Angeles NWSL team

References

External links
Official Los Angeles Sol Website (archive)

 
Women's Professional Soccer teams
Defunct soccer clubs in California
Soccer clubs in California
Association football clubs established in 2007
Association football clubs disestablished in 2010
2007 establishments in California
2010 disestablishments in California
Anschutz Corporation